Strongyloides serpentis is a parasitic roundworm infecting the intestine of the green water snake, hence its name. It was first described from Louisiana.

References

Further reading
Dorris, Mark, Mark E. Viney, and Mark L. Blaxter. "Molecular phylogenetic analysis of the genus Strongyloides and related nematodes." International journal for parasitology 32.12 (2002): 1507–1517.
Dos Santos, K. R., et al. "Morphological and molecular characterization of Strongyloides ophidiae (Nematoda, Strongyloididae)." Journal of helminthology84.02 (2010): 136–142.
Veazey, Ronald S., T. Bonner Stewart, and Theron G. Snider III. "Ureteritis and nephritis in a Burmese python (Python molurus bivitattus) due to Strongyloides sp. infection." Journal of Zoo and Wildlife Medicine (1994): 119–122.

External links

Strongylidae
Parasitic nematodes of vertebrates
Parasites of reptiles
Nematodes described in 1966